Hyaloperina is a genus of moths in the subfamily Lymantriinae. The genus was erected by Per Olof Christopher Aurivillius in 1904.

Species
Hyaloperina erythroma Collenette, 1960 Tanzania
Hyaloperina nudiuscula Aurivillius, 1904 Congo
Hyaloperina privata Hering, 1926 western Africa
Hyaloperina vitrina Hering, 1926

References

Lymantriinae